Artamet may refer to:

 Edremit, Van, a district and city in Van Province, Turkey, known in Armenian as Artamet
 Artamet, a village in the Armavir Province of Armenia